The 1937 Pacific hurricane season ran through the summer and fall of 1937. Before the satellite age started in the 1960s, data on east Pacific hurricanes was extremely unreliable. Most east Pacific storms were of no threat to land. 1937 season was mostly inactive season, as there is no known tropical cyclones in September during this season. In May, a tropical cyclone struck Acapulco, cutting that city off from the outside communication for four days, causing buildings in the city to be damaged, and caused a woman's death.

Systems

Tropical Cyclone One
On May 25, a tropical cyclone was detected south of Acapulco. The cyclone headed northwards, made landfall directly at Acapulco that day. Weather associated with this tropical cyclone made it to Gulf of Mexico, where they became a depression in the Bay of Campeche on May 27. However, this depression never developed into anything.

This tropical cyclone destroyed telephone and telegraph lines leading into Acapulco, cutting that city off from the outside world for four days. Numerous buildings in the city were damaged. Several fishing boats were missing, and a woman was killed when a telephone pole was blown down on her.

Possible Tropical Cyclone Two
On June 16, while west of the Revillagigedo Islands, a ship encountered a possible westward-moving tropical cyclone.

Tropical Cyclone Three
On June 23, a tropical cyclone was spotted developing south of Acapulco. It had fully formed by June 24, and moved  northward. It then turned to the north-northeast and approached the Gulf of California, where it subsequently dissipated on June 26.

Hurricane Four
On August 31, a hurricane was observed west of the Revillagigedo Islands.

Tropical Cyclone Five
On October 24, a tropical cyclone formed well south of the Revillagigedo Islands. It rapidly headed northeast, and had approached land somewhere between Manzanillo and Cape Corrientes by October 27. At that point, the cyclone fell apart and ceased to exist.

See also

1937 Atlantic hurricane season
1937 Pacific typhoon season
1930s North Indian Ocean cyclone seasons
 1900–1940 South Pacific cyclone seasons
 1900–1950 South-West Indian Ocean cyclone seasons
 1930s Australian region cyclone seasons

References

1937 in Mexico
Pacific hurricane seasons
1930s Pacific hurricane seasons